Pinnoite is a magnesium borate mineral with formula: MgB2O(OH)6 or MgB2O4·3(H2O). It crystallizes in the tetragonal crystal system and occurs as colorless to yellow or light green radial fibrous clusters and rarely as short prismatic crystals.

Pinnoite was first described in 1884 for an occurrence in the Stassfurt potash deposit, Saxony-Anhalt, Germany and named for the mine counselor Oberbergrat Pinno of Halle, Germany. It occurs in marine evaporite deposits and as efflorescence associated with mineral springs. It occurs with boracite  and kaliborite. It also occurs in the borax mines of Death Valley in California, the Da
Quidam saline lake of the Qinghai-Xizang Plateau in Tibet and in Socacastro, Salta Province, Argentina.

References

Borate minerals
Tetragonal minerals
Minerals in space group 77